Sylvestre Nsanzimana (5 January 1936 – 1999)  born in Gikongoro Province, Rwanda served as Prime Minister of Rwanda from 12 October 1991 to 2 April 1992. He belonged to the National Republican Movement for Democracy and Development and previously served as minister of justice in the government of Juvénal Habyarimana. He stepped down as prime minister following the refusal of opposition parties to take part in the government.

Other works 
He also served as Rwanda's Minister of Foreign Affairs from 1969 to 1971. He was also a director at a university.

Personal life and family 

Sylvestre Nsanzimana was married. He had 4 children. With his family, they lived for over 10 years in Ethiopia where the children schooled in Lycée Guébré-Mariam and returned to Rwanda. His wife died of illness in 1988. He died in 1999 of illness in Belgium.

References

1935 births
1999 deaths 
Prime Ministers of Rwanda
Foreign ministers of Rwanda
Industry ministers of Rwanda
Justice ministers of Rwanda
Mining ministers of Rwanda
Trade ministers of Rwanda
National Republican Movement for Democracy and Development politicians